Frank Gibson may refer to:
 Frank Gibson (baseball) (1890–1961), American baseball catcher
 Frank Gibson Jr. (born 1946), New Zealand jazz drummer
 Frank Gibson (footballer) (1904–1977), Australian rules footballer for Fitzroy
 Sir Frank Gibson (politician) (1878–1965), Australian politician
 Frank M. Gibson (born 1916/17), Canadian businessman
 Frank William Ernest Gibson, Australian biochemist and molecular biologist

See also
 Francis Gibson (disambiguation)
 Frank Gibson Costello (1903–1987), Australian architect